General der Fallschirmtruppe (en: General of the parachute corps) was a General of the branch rank of the Deutsche Luftwaffe (en: German Air Force) in Nazi Germany. Until the end of World War II in 1945, this particular general officer rank was on three-star level (OF-8), equivalent to a US Lieutenant general.

The "General of the branch" ranks of the Luftwaffe were in 1945:
 General of parachute troops
 General of anti-aircraft artillery
 General of the aviators
 General of air force communications troops
 General of the air force

The rank was equivalent to the General of the branch ranks of the Heer (army) as follows:
Heer
 General of artillery
 General of mountain troops
 General of infantry
 General of cavalry
 General of the communications troops
 General of panzer troops (armoured troops)
 General of engineers
 General of the medical corps
 General of the veterinary corps

Other services
The rank was also equivalent to the German three-star ranks:
 Admiral of the Kriegsmarine, equivalent to (US Vice admiral) and
 SS-Obergruppenführer und General der Waffen-SS in the Waffen-SS.

List of officers who were General der Fallschirmtruppe 

 Bruno Bräuer
 Paul Conrath
 Richard Heidrich
 Eugen Meindl
 Hermann-Bernhard Ramcke
 Alfred Schlemm
 Kurt Student

See also

General (Germany)
Comparative officer ranks of World War II

Three-star officers of Nazi Germany
Military parachuting in Germany
Military ranks of Germany
Lists of generals